The 1954 Arizona Wildcats baseball team represented the University of Arizona in the 1954 NCAA baseball season. The Wildcats played their home games at UA Field. The team was coached by Frank Sancet in his 5th year at Arizona.

The Wildcats won the District VII Playoff to advanced to the College World Series, where they were defeated by the Oklahoma A&M Cowboys.

Roster

Schedule 

! style="" | Regular Season
|- valign="top" 

|- align="center" bgcolor="#ccffcc"
| 1 || March 1 ||  || UA Field • Tucson, Arizona || 11–4 || 1–0 || –
|- align="center" bgcolor="#ffcccc"
| 2 || March 2 || Sul Ross || UA Field • Tucson, Arizona || 2–4 || 1–1 || –
|- align="center" bgcolor="#ccffcc"
| 3 || March 5 ||  || UA Field • Tucson, Arizona || 12–1 || 2–1 || –
|- align="center" bgcolor="#ccffcc"
| 4 || March 6 || UCLA || UA Field • Tucson, Arizona || 15–3 || 3–1 || –
|- align="center" bgcolor="#ccffcc"
| 5 || March 13 || Luke Air Force Base || UA Field • Tucson, Arizona || 16–0 || 4–1 || –
|- align="center" bgcolor="#ccffcc"
| 6 || March 13 || Luke Air Force Base || UA Field • Tucson, Arizona || 16–3 || 5–1 || –
|- align="center" bgcolor="#ccffcc"
| 7 || March 17 || Davis–Monthan Air Force Base || UA Field • Tucson, Arizona || 16–0 || 6–1 || –
|- align="center" bgcolor="#ccffcc"
| 8 || March 19 || at  || Unknown • Las Cruces, New Mexico || 16–0 || 7–1 || 1–0
|- align="center" bgcolor="#ccffcc"
| 9 || March 20 || at New Mexico A&M ||Unknown • Las Cruces, New Mexico || 30–1 || 8–1 || 2–0
|- align="center" bgcolor="#ccffcc"
| 10 || March 25 ||  || UA Field • Tucson, Arizona || 10–2 || 9–1 || 2–0
|- align="center" bgcolor="#ccffcc"
| 11 || March 25 || Utah || UA Field • Tucson, Arizona || 6–5 || 10–1 || 2–0
|- align="center" bgcolor="#ffcccc"
| 12 || March 26 || Utah || UA Field • Tucson, Arizona || 4–12 || 10–2 || 2–0
|- align="center" bgcolor="#ccffcc"
| 13 || March 26 || Utah || UA Field • Tucson, Arizona || 10–1 || 11–2 || 2–0
|- align="center" bgcolor="#ccffcc"
| 14 || March 29 || Davis–Monthan Air Force Base || UA Field • Tucson, Arizona || 2–1 || 12–2 || 2–0
|-

|- align="center" bgcolor="#ffcccc"
| 15 || April 1 || Marine Corps Base Camp Pendleton || UA Field • Tucson, Arizona || 10–14 || 12–3 || 2–0
|- align="center" bgcolor="#ccffcc"
| 16 || April 2 || Marine Corps Base Camp Pendleton || UA Field • Tucson, Arizona || 25–5 || 13–3 || 2–0
|- align="center" bgcolor="#ccffcc"
| 17 || April 3 || Luke Air Force Base || UA Field • Tucson, Arizona || 7–6 || 14–3 || 2–0
|- align="center" bgcolor="#ccffcc"
| 18 || April 3 || Luke Air Force Base || UA Field • Tucson, Arizona || 7–3 || 15–3 || 2–0
|- align="center" bgcolor="#ccffcc"
| 19 || April 5 ||  || UA Field • Tucson, Arizona || 12–7 || 16–3 || 2–0
|- align="center" bgcolor="#ccffcc"
| 20 || April 6 || Wyoming || UA Field • Tucson, Arizona || 21–3 || 17–3 || 2–0
|- align="center" bgcolor="#ccffcc"
| 21 || April 7 || Wyoming || UA Field • Tucson, Arizona || 7–0 || 18–3 || 2–0
|- align="center" bgcolor="#ffcccc"
| 22 || April 8 || San Diego Naval Air Station || UA Field • Tucson, Arizona || 5–15 || 18–4 || 2–0
|- align="center" bgcolor="#ccffcc"
| 23 || April 9 ||  || UA Field • Tucson, Arizona || 25–5 || 19–4 || 2–0
|- align="center" bgcolor="#ccffcc"
| 24 || April 10 || Pacific || UA Field • Tucson, Arizona || 8–1 || 20–4 || 2–0
|- align="center" bgcolor="#ccffcc"
| 25 || April 12 ||  || UA Field • Tucson, Arizona || 4–3 || 21–4 || 2–0
|- align="center" bgcolor="#ffcccc"
| 26 || April 13 || Iowa || UA Field • Tucson, Arizona || 2–3 || 21–5 || 2–0
|- align="center" bgcolor="#ccffcc"
| 27 || April 14 || Iowa || UA Field • Tucson, Arizona || 6–5 || 22–5 || 2–0
|- align="center" bgcolor="#ccffcc"
| 28 || April 16 || Iowa || UA Field • Tucson, Arizona || 17–9 || 23–5 || 2–0
|- align="center" bgcolor="#ccffcc"
| 29 || April 17 || Iowa || UA Field • Tucson, Arizona || 6–5 || 24–5 || 2–0
|- align="center" bgcolor="#ffcccc"
| 30 || April 17 || Iowa || UA Field • Tucson, Arizona || 1–13 || 24–6 || 2–0
|- align="center" bgcolor="#ccffcc"
| 31 || April 19 || at  || UA Field • Malibu, California || 15–4 || 25–6 || 2–0
|- align="center" bgcolor="#ccffcc"
| 32 || April 20 || at UCLA || Joe E. Brown Field • Los Angeles, California || 2–1 || 26–6 || 2–0
|- align="center" bgcolor="#ccffcc"
| 33 || April 21 || at  || Unknown • San Diego, California || 3–1 || 27–6 || 2–0
|- align="center" bgcolor="#ffcccc"
| 34 || April 22 || Marine Recreation Department || UA Field • Tucson, Arizona || 2–3 || 27–7 || 2–0
|- align="center" bgcolor="#ccffcc"
| 35 || April 23 || Naval Air Skyraiders || UA Field • Tucson, Arizona || 9–4 || 28–7 || 2–0
|- align="center" bgcolor="#ccffcc"
| 36 || April 24 || Naval Training Center || UA Field • Tucson, Arizona || 2–1 || 29–7 || 2–0
|- align="center" bgcolor="#ccffcc"
| 37 || April 24 || Naval Training Center || UA Field • Tucson, Arizona || 6–4 || 30–7 || 2–0
|- align="center" bgcolor="#ccffcc"
| 38 || April 29 || Naval Training Center || UA Field • Tucson, Arizona || 16–5 || 31–7 || 2–0
|- align="center" bgcolor="#ccffcc"
| 39 || April 30 || Marine Recreation Department || UA Field • Tucson, Arizona || 8–7 || 32–7 || 2–0
|-

|- align="center" bgcolor="#ccffcc"
| 40 || May 1 || Marine Recreation Department || UA Field • Tucson, Arizona || 11–4 || 33–7 || 2–0
|- align="center" bgcolor="#ccffcc"
| 41 || May 3 || Davis–Monthan Air Force Base || UA Field • Tucson, Arizona || 12–4 || 34–7 || 2–0
|- align="center" bgcolor="#ccffcc"
| 42 || May 11 || Davis–Monthan Air Force Base || UA Field • Tucson, Arizona || 10–7 || 35–7 || 2–0
|- align="center" bgcolor="#ccffcc"
| 43 || May 11 || Davis–Monthan Air Force Base || UA Field • Tucson, Arizona || 4–3 || 36–7 || 2–0
|-

|-
|-
! style="" | Postseason
|- valign="top"

|- align="center" bgcolor="#ccffcc"
| 44 || June 4 || at  || Jackson Field • Greeley, Colorado || 8–2 || 37–7 || 2–0
|- align="center" bgcolor="#ccffcc"
| 45 || June 5 || vs Wyoming || Jackson Field • Greeley, Colorado || 16–9 || 38–7 || 2–0
|- align="center" bgcolor="#ccffcc"
| 46 || June 7 || at Colorado State || Jackson Field • Greeley, Colorado || 8–5 || 39–7 || 2–0
|-

|- align="center" bgcolor="#ccffcc"
| 47 || June 10 || vs Oregon || Omaha Municipal Stadium • Omaha, Nebraska || 12–1 || 40–7 || 2–0
|- align="center" bgcolor="#ffcccc"
| 48 || June 11 || vs Michigan State || Johnny Rosenblatt Stadium • Omaha, Nebraska || 1–2 || 40–8 || 2–0
|- align="center" bgcolor="#ffcccc"
| 49 || June 11 || vs  || Johnny Rosenblatt Stadium • Omaha, Nebraska || 4–5 || 40–9 || 2–0
|-

Awards and honors 
Russ Gragg
Second Team All-American American Baseball Coaches Association

Carl Thomas
Third Team All-American American Baseball Coaches Association

References 

Arizona Wildcats baseball seasons
Arizona Wildcats baseball
College World Series seasons
Arizona